Martin de Barcos (1600–1678), was a French Catholic priest and  theologian of the Jansenist School.

Life
Barcos was born at Bayonne, a nephew of Jean du Vergier de Hauranne, the commendatory abbot of the Abbey of Saint-Cyran in the Duchy of Berry, who sent him to Belgium to be taught by Cornelius Jansen. When he returned to France he served for a time as tutor to a son of Robert Arnauld d'Andilly and later, in 1644, succeeded his uncle as the owner of the abbey. He did much to improve the abbey; new buildings were erected, and the library much enhanced.

Unlike many commendatory abbots of his day, however, who scarcely ever saw the monasteries over which they held authority, Barcos became an active member of the abbey, became a priest in 1647, and gave himself up to the rigid asceticism preached by his sect. He died there.

Barcos' ties with Du Vergier and Arnauld and, through them, with the Abbey of Port-Royal-des-Champs, soon brought him to the front in the debates about Jansenism. He collaborated with his uncle in the Petrus Aurelius and with Arnauld in the book on Frequent Communion.

Writings
Of Barcos' own treatises, some bear on authority in the Church and some on the then-much mooted questions of grace and predestination. To the first class belong (1) De l'autorité de saint Pierre et de saint Paul (1645), (2) Grandeur de l'Église de Rome qui repose sur l'autorité de saint Pierre et de saint Paul (1645). (3) Éclaircissements sur quelques objections que l'on a formées contre la grandeur de l'Église de Rome (1646). These three books were written in support of an assertion contained in the book On Frequent Communion, namely: "St. Peter and St. Paul are the two heads of the Roman Church and the two are one". This theory of dual church authority, implying an equality of the two apostles, was condemned as heretical by Pope Innocent X in 1674 (Denzinger, Enchiridion, 965).

To the second class belong:

A censure of Jacques Sirmond's Praedestinatus (1644).
Quae sit Sancti Augustini et doctrinae eius auctoritas in ecclesia? (1650). Barcos holds that a proposition clearly founded on St. Augustine can be absolutely accepted and taught, regardless of a papal bull. For this he was condemned by Pope Alexander VIII, 1690 (Cf. Denzinger, no. 1187). Some critics of the Jansenists argued that they placed too much emphasis on their interpretation various teachings of Augustine. 
Exposition de la foy de l'Église romaine touchant la grâce et la prédestination (1696). This book was written at the request of the Jansenist Bishop of Aleth, Nicolas Pavillon, and may be looked upon as the official exposé of Jansenism. It was condemned by the Holy Office, 1697, and again, 1704, when it was published with the Instructions sur la grâce of Antoine Arnauld.

References
 cites:
Hugo Hurter, Nomenclator, II (Innsbruck, 1893); 
Migne, Dict. de biog. Chret. (Paris, 1851);

1600 births
1678 deaths
People from Bayonne
Jansenists
17th-century French Catholic theologians
17th-century French Roman Catholic priests
Burials in Centre-Val de Loire